Springfield Maroons may refer to sports teams based in Springfield, Massachusetts:

 the athletic teams of Springfield College, circa 1950s
 the minor league baseball team of 1895, known as the Springfield Ponies in other years